Confederate Memorial Fountain may refer to two fountains:

Confederate Memorial Fountain in Hopkinsville in Hopkinsville, Kentucky, U.S.
Confederate Memorial Fountain (Helena, Montana) in Helena, Montana, U.S.
Coppini Confederate Memorial Fountain, also known as the Littlefield Fountain, in Austin, Texas, U.S.